The Metro Manila Film Festival Award for Best Actress is an award presented annually by the Metropolitan Manila Development Authority (MMDA). It was first awarded at the 1st Metro Manila Film Festival ceremony, held in 1975; Charito Solis received the award for her role in Araw-Araw, Gabi-Gabi and it is given in honor of an actress who has delivered an outstanding performance in a leading role while working within the film industry. Currently, nominees and winners are determined by Executive Committees, headed by the Metropolitan Manila Development Authority Chairman and key members of the film industry.

Winners and nominees

1970s

1980s

1990s

2000s

2010s

2020s

Multiple awards for Best Actress
Throughout the history of Metro Manila Film Festival (MMFF), there have been actresses who received multiple Awards for Best Actress. As of 2019 (45th MMFF), 7 actresses have received two or more Best Actress awards.

Notes

References

External links
 IMDB: Metro Manila Film Festival
 Official website of the Metro Manila Film Festival

Actress
Film awards for lead actress